The president of the Maldives is the head of state and head of government of the Republic of Maldives and the commander-in-chief of the Maldives National Defence Force.

The current president is Ibrahim Mohamed Solih elected in 2018 by a majority of 58.4%, taking the government from Abdulla Yameen Abdul Gayoom.

Qualifications
The Constitution of the Maldives requires the following for a president: 
 be a Maldivian citizen born to parents who are Maldivian citizens
 and who is not also a citizen of a foreign country
 be a Muslim and a follower of a Sunni school of Islam;

List of officeholders

Key 

Political parties

Latest election

Results

See also

Politics of the Maldives
History of the Maldives
List of sultans of the Maldives
List of head of state of the Maldives
Prime Minister of the Maldives
Vice President of the Maldives
First Lady of the Maldives

References

Government of the Maldives
 
1953 establishments in the Maldives
Maldives politics-related lists